Bogusław Rogalski (born 11 March 1972 in Maków Mazowiecki) is a far-right Polish politician and the current leader of Union of Christian Families.

He graduated in 1997 from the Olsztyn Pedagogical University. As a student, between 1993 and 1997 he was chairman of the Olsztyn district of All-Polish Youth, and member of the National Party in the same district. he became a member of the Polish-American Historical Association in 2001 and since 2003 is an Honorary Chairman of the Association for Polish Children of War.

He then joined the League of Polish Families, where he played several key roles. He was elected regional councillor in the Warmian-Masurian Voivodeship, was a member of the party's Policy Council, chairman of the party's Union of Councillors and Warmian-Masurian district branch.

having been elected in the 2004 European Parliament election in Poland, until 2009 he was a Member of the European Parliament (MEP) for the Podlasie and Warmian-Masurian voivodships in the north-east of Poland. He represented the League of Polish Families and was in the Alliance of a Europe for the Nations Group, he sat on the European Parliament's Committee on International Trade. Rogalski was also a substitute for the Committee on Foreign Affairs and a member of the Delegation for relations with the countries of the Andean Community.

He left LPR in 2005, went on to co-find a new political party, Forward Poland, which existed for two years until 2010. In 2009 he was a candidate for the mayor of Olsztyn in the by-election where he received 4% of the vote.

In 2015 he became chairman and co-founded the Union of Christian Families political party.

External links
 
 
 

1972 births
Living people
People from Maków County
League of Polish Families MEPs
MEPs for Poland 2004–2009
University of Warmia and Mazury in Olsztyn alumni